Tommy Berntsen (born 18 December 1973) is a Norwegian former professional football defender. He played the majority of his career at Lillestrøm S.K. and Lyn in the Norwegian Premier League.

Since 2010, Berntsen is involved with a youth coach role at Lyn.

Club career
Berntsen began his playing career at Vålerenga, but failed to make the first team. He spent the next few years in the lower divisions, playing for local clubs Lørenskog IF and Skjetten SK. His breakthrough came in 1998 when he signed for Lillestrøm, where he and his teammate Torgeir Bjarmann made up one of the best central defences in the Norwegian Tippeligaen (Premier Division).

In January 2001, Berntsen left Norway for Germany and Eintracht Frankfurt. His stay, however, was not a success and he only played three matches for the first team. He returned to Norway for a fresh start in December 2001 and was signed by Lyn, where he played since. He acted briefly as a player-coach of the team in 2003. Together with Steven Lustü he once again formed part of a formidable defense. In the 2005 season, no club conceded fewer goals than Lyn.  Berntsen has struggled with injuries over several periods, but always remained the captain and featured regularly in the Lyn side the last seasons of his career.

International career
Berntsen was capped twice for the Norwegian national team. He last appeared in a friendly against Singapore in 2004.

References

External links
 Profile at lynfotball.net 
 
 

1973 births
Living people
People from Lørenskog
Association football defenders
Norwegian footballers
Norway international footballers
Kniksen Award winners
Vålerenga Fotball players
Lørenskog IF players
Skjetten SK players
Lillestrøm SK players
Portsmouth F.C. players
Eintracht Frankfurt players
Lyn Fotball players
Bundesliga players
Norwegian expatriate footballers
Expatriate footballers in England
Expatriate footballers in Germany
Norwegian expatriate sportspeople in England
Norwegian expatriate sportspeople in Germany
Norwegian football managers
Lyn Fotball managers
Sportspeople from Viken (county)